Hillyfields is a village and suburb of Southampton in the civil parish of Nursling and Rownhams, in the Test Valley district of Hampshire, England. The suburb lies east of the River Test and M271 motorway.

Villages in Hampshire
Test Valley